Ruggero Gerlin (5 January 1899 – 17 June 1983) was an Italian harpsichordist.

Life 
Born in Venice,  Gerlin studied the piano at the Milan Conservatory  then moved to Paris in 1920 to study harpsichord with Wanda Landowska.
 
He continued to work with her until 1940, particularly during concerts with two harpsichords. He returned to Italy in 1941 to become a harpsichord teacher at the Music Conservatories of Naples. He also led master classes at the Accademia Musicale Chigiana of Siena. Among his many students were Huguette Dreyfus, Kenneth Gilbert and Blandine Verlet.

He performed in many concerts and for many harpsichord recordings, including the complete works of François Couperin, Louis Couperin and Jean-Philippe Rameau. He was also responsible for the publication of works by Alessandro Scarlatti, Benedetto Marcello, etc.

References

External links 
 Ruggero Merlin on IMSLP
 Ruggero Gerlin
 Discography on Discogs
 Ruggero Gerlin on Encyclopedie Universalis
 Biography on Bach Cantatas Website
János Sebestyén – Ruggero Gerlin Harpsicordist
 Scarlatti - Ruggero Gerlin (1956) Various sonatas (YouTube)

1899 births
1983 deaths
Musicians from Venice
Italian harpsichordists
Italian music educators
20th-century classical musicians